Khalid al-Ansari was a cabinet minister and judge in Syria. He served as justice minister in Hafez al-Assad's cabinet in the early 1990s.

Public career
Khalid al-Ansari served on Syria's court of economic security prior to his appointment to cabinet.

In 1990, while serving as justice minister, he received a request from the government of East Germany for the extradition of Nazi war criminal Alois Brunner, who was widely believed to be living in Syria under an assumed name.

Criticism
Syrian Human Rights Association president Muhanad Alhansi issued a paper in 2011 entitled, "A Study on the independence of the legal profession in Syria," in which he described al-Ansari as having set draconian legal precedents as a judge and as having interfered with the court of economic security's independence while in cabinet. Alhansi's article also describes al-Ansari as deceased.

References

Syrian ministers of justice